Planet of the Stereos is the debut studio album released by Australian band Lo-Tel. The album was released in October 2000 and peaked at number 41 on the ARIA Charts.

At the ARIA Music Awards of 2001, the album was nominated for the ARIA Award for Breakthrough Artist – Album; losing out to Since I Left You by The Avalanches.

Reception

Johnny Loftus from AllMusic said "Lo-Tel sounds at varying times like Vertical Horizon covering Seether, or vice versa. Opener 'A Pop Song Saved My Life' is a crunchy mid-tempo rocker jazzed up with wee-oo wee-oo synths, while the single 'Teenager of the Year' opts for a thicker post-grunge sound. Those whizzy keys return for 'Genre Casting', and 'Same...' is hooky enough to make an impression beyond its slick layers of electronics and electric guitar." adding "...Fans of mature, well-crafted alt rock with a slick pop edge should pick up a copy, and impress friends who only have Goo Goo Dolls albums."

Track listing
 "A Pop Song Saved My Life" - 3:32
 "Hudson N.Y" - 4:23
 "Crucifix" - 3:29
 "Teenager of the Year" - 4:30
 "Same..." - 3:01
 "Anytime You See Fit" - 1:05
 "Sweet Janelle" - 3:13
 "Fashion" - 3:52
 "Genre Casting" - 3:20
 "Disconnected" - 3:05
 "An Open Letter" - 3:43
 "Game Show Host" - 8:39

Enhanced CD
 "Genre Casting"  (video) - 3:20
 "A Pop Song Saved My Life"  (video) - 3:28
 "Teenager of the Year" (video) - 3:23

Charts

Release history

References

2000 debut albums
Lo-Tel albums
Murmur (record label) albums